Shamsabad-e Chahdegal (also Romanized as Shamsābād-e Chāhdegāl) is a village in Chahdegal Rural District, Negin Kavir District, Fahraj County, Kerman Province, Iran. At the 2006 census, its population was 161, in 38 families.

References 

Populated places in Fahraj County